The deputy speaker of the House of Representatives is the second highest-ranking member of the Federal House of Representatives of Nigeria after the speaker. The current deputy speaker is Ahmed Idris Wase who was elected on 11 June 2019. The deputy speaker presides over the House in the absence of the speaker. The deputy speaker is elected by a majority of the members of the House of Representatives.

List of deputy speakers

References

Official website of the House of Representatives
Assemblyonline, news agency on Nigeria's National Assembly

Nigeria
Deputy Speakers